The American Friend is a 1977 neo-noir film by Wim Wenders, adapted from the 1974 novel Ripley's Game by Patricia Highsmith. The film features Dennis Hopper as career criminal Tom Ripley and Bruno Ganz as Jonathan Zimmermann, a terminally ill picture framer whom Ripley coerces into becoming an assassin. The film uses an unusual "natural" language concept: Zimmermann speaks German with his family and his doctor, but English with Ripley and while visiting Paris.

Plot
Tom Ripley (Dennis Hopper) is a wealthy American living in Hamburg, Germany. He is involved in an artwork forgery scheme, in which he appears at auctions to bid on forged paintings produced by an accomplice to drive up the price. At one of these auctions, he is introduced to Jonathan Zimmermann (Bruno Ganz), a picture framer who is dying of leukemia. Zimmermann refuses to shake Ripley's hand when introduced, coldly saying "I've heard of you" before walking away.

A French criminal, Raoul Minot (Gérard Blain), asks Ripley to murder a rival gangster. Ripley declines, but in order to get even for Zimmermann's slight, suggests Minot use Zimmermann for the job. Ripley spreads rumors that Zimmerman's illness has suddenly worsened. Minot offers Zimmerman a great deal of money to kill the gangster. Zimmermann initially turns Minot down, but becomes greatly distressed by the thought that he may not have long to live and wants to provide for his wife and son. He agrees to go to France with Minot for a second medical opinion. Minot arranges to have the results falsified to make Zimmermann expect the worst. Zimmermann agrees to shoot the gangster in a Paris Métro station. Ripley visits Zimmermann in his shop before and after the shooting to get a picture framed. Zimmermann is unaware of Ripley's involvement in the murder plot, and the two begin to form a bond.

Minot visits Ripley again to report his satisfaction with Zimmermann's performance. Ripley, who has grown to like Zimmerman, is appalled when Minot says he plans to have him murder another rival gangster, this time on a speeding train using a garrote. Before Zimmermann can complete the murder, the target's bodyguard catches him. Ripley appears on the train and overpowers him. Zimmermann and Ripley execute the target and the bodyguard. They meet outside and Ripley confesses to suggesting him to Minot, and declines Zimmermann's suggestion to keep half the money for the second hit. Ripley asks Zimmermann to tell Minot that he did the job on the train alone. Back home, Zimmermann argues with his wife, Marianne, who does not believe his stories of being paid to undergo experimental treatments.

Zimmermann has been receiving mysterious phone calls and suspects the Mafia is trying to find him. His fears grow worse when Minot tells him that his own flat was recently bombed. Ripley picks up Zimmermann and they drive to his mansion to wait for the assassins Ripley expects to appear. Ripley and Zimmermann ambush and kill the assassins. Ripley piles their bodies into the ambulance in which they arrived. Before he and Zimmermann can leave to dispose of the bodies, Marianne arrives and tells Zimmermann that the French medical reports are fake. Ripley explains that she and her husband can settle matters later, but now they need to dispose of the bodies. They drive to the sea, Ripley in the ambulance and Marianne driving her husband in their car. On an isolated beach, Ripley douses the ambulance with gasoline and sets fire to it. Zimmermann drives away with Marianne, abandoning Ripley. Moments later, he dies at the wheel; Marianne pulls the emergency brake and survives. At the beach, Ripley says to himself, "We made it anyway, Jonathan. Be careful."

Cast

 Dennis Hopper as Tom Ripley 
 Bruno Ganz as Jonathan Zimmermann 
 Lisa Kreuzer as Marianne Zimmermann 
 Gérard Blain as Raoul Minot 
 Nicholas Ray as "Derwatt"
 Samuel Fuller as The American
 Peter Lilienthal as Marcangelo
 Daniel Schmid as Igraham
 Jean Eustache as Friendly Man 
 Sandy Whitelaw as Doctor
 Lou Castel as Rodolphe 
 Andreas Dedecke as Daniel
 David Blue as Allan Winter

Production
Wenders was a fan of Patricia Highsmith and wanted to adapt one of her novels to film, especially The Tremor of Forgery or The Cry of the Owl. When he learned that the rights to these novels and Highsmith's other novels had been sold, he met with her and she offered him the unpublished manuscript of Ripley's Game, which was published in 1974. Wenders also uses elements of Ripley Under Ground, though he did not have the rights to do so.

Wenders wanted to cast John Cassavetes as Ripley, who declined and suggested Hopper for the part. After casting Hopper, an experienced director, Wenders decided to cast directors in all the gangster roles, including Gérard Blain, Nicholas Ray, and Samuel Fuller. He disliked the title Ripley's Game and shot the film under the title Framed. He also considered the title Rule Without Exception. He credits Hopper with suggesting the title The American Friend.

American popular music is heard at several points in the film. Ripley quotes the song "Ballad of Easy Rider" from Easy Rider, a film Hopper directed and starred in, and Bob Dylan's "One More Cup of Coffee" and "I Pity the Poor Immigrant." Zimmermann plays or sings songs by the Kinks, "Too Much on My Mind" and "Nothin' in the World Can Stop Me Worryin' 'Bout That Girl", in his shop. Summer in the City, Wenders's first full-length feature film, was dedicated to The Kinks. Ripley tells Zimmermann that he's "bringing the Beatles back to Hamburg," and Zimmermann quotes their song "Drive My Car" later in the film.

Critical reaction
In A Girl and a Gun: The Complete Guide to Film Noir, David N. Meyer says: "Though the plot may not make a whole lot of sense the first time around—and the thick European accents of a couple of the major actors doesn't help—The American Friend is worth the effort. Few movies from any era or genre offer such rich characters, realistic human relationships, gripping action sequences, or sly humor." In Out of the Past: Adventures in Film Noir, Barry Gifford writes, "Of all the 'homage' films made since the 1940s and '50s meant to evoke noir, The American Friend succeeds more than most because of the spaces, the sputters, and sudden shifts of energy that allow the characters to achieve veracity."

The film was entered into the 1977 Cannes Film Festival. It has a 91% approval rating on Rotten Tomatoes based on 22 reviews, with a weighted average of 7.33/10. The Critics' Consensus reads, "The American Friend is a slow burning existential thriller that does justice to the Patricia Highsmith source novel." Roger Ebert gave the film three stars (out of four), writing: "[Wenders] challenges us to admit that we watch (and read) thrillers as much for atmosphere as for plot. And then he gives us so much atmosphere we're almost swimming in it." David Nusair of Reel Film Reviews had a more mixed reaction, calling the film "occasionally thrilling" and praising "Ganz's subtle, thoroughly compelling performance" but criticizing what he called a "disastrous final half hour."

Highsmith initially disliked the film but later changed her mind. Joan Schenkar's biography The Talented Miss Highsmith: The Secret Life and Serious Art of Patricia Highsmith quotes Wenders: "I was really happy with the picture and couldn't wait to have Patricia see it. But then, to my great disappointment, she was quite disturbed by it, didn't conceal that either and didn't have anything good to say about it after the screening. I left utterly frustrated. Months later, I got a letter from her. She said she had seen the film a second time, this time in a public screening on the Champs-Élysées during a visit in Paris. And she had much better feelings about it now. ... And she was full of praise for Dennis Hopper, too, whom she had flat-out rejected the first time. She now wrote that my film had captured the essence of that Ripley character better than any other films. You can guess how relieved I was!" In a 1988 interview, Highsmith praised the film's "stylishness" and said the scenes on the train were "terrific."

The film was selected as the West German entry for the Best Foreign Language Film at the 50th Academy Awards, but was not accepted as a nominee. It was nominated for Best Foreign Language Film by the U.S. National Board of Review.

Adaptations

The American Friend is the second Ripley big-screen adaptation, after Purple Noon. It was followed by 1999's  The Talented Mr. Ripley, 2002's Ripley's Game and 2005's Ripley Underground. The Ripley films do not form an official series, or precede or follow on from each other.

See also
 List of submissions to the 50th Academy Awards for Best Foreign Language Film
 List of German submissions for the Academy Award for Best Foreign Language Film
 Ripley's Game (film), a 2002 adaptation of the same novel

References

Bibliography
 Schenkar, Joan. The Talented Miss Highsmith: The Secret Life and Serious Art of Patricia Highsmith. St. Martin's Press, 2009.

External links
 
 Two Faces of Ripley, filmbrain.com comparison of The American Friend and Ripley's Game
The American Friend: Little Lies and Big Disasters an essay by Francine Prose at the Criterion Collection

1977 films
1977 crime drama films
1970s psychological thriller films
West German films
German crime drama films
German psychological thriller films
1970s German-language films
Films about organized crime in Germany
Films based on American crime novels
Films based on works by Patricia Highsmith
Films directed by Wim Wenders
Films shot in Hamburg
Films shot in New York City
Films shot in Paris
Films set in 1976
Films set in Hamburg
Films set in West Germany
Films set in New York City
Films set in Paris
Films set on trains
German neo-noir films
Films about con artists
Films scored by Jürgen Knieper
1970s German films
French neo-noir films
1970s French films
French psychological thriller films
French crime drama films
1970s English-language films
English-language German films
English-language French films